Andreas Toba (born 7 October 1990 in Hanover) is a German gymnast. He is a three-time Olympian, having represented Germany at the 2012, 2016, and 2020 Olympic Games.

Personal life
Toba is the son of former Romanian-German gymnast Marius Toba, who competed at three Olympic Games from 1988 to 2000. He's currently a student in Hannover.

Career
Toba started off for TK Hannover and is trained by Reinhard Rückriem. At the 2008 Junior European championship in Lausanne, Toba won the bronze medal with his team and placed 7th on the high bar and 9th in the multiple stage-competition respectively.

Toba entered the German national team in 2009. In the 2009 German championship, he placed 6th in the multiple stage competition and 7th one year later. In 2011, he won Bronze on the high bar and placed 4th on the bars and on the pommel horse. He placed 4th in the multiple-stage-competition again, but became runners-up on the high bar and on the rings, and second runner-up on the pommel horse. He placed 5th on the rings at the Challenge Cup in Doha. He qualified for the Olympic Games 2012 in London as fourth-placed.

In the 2016 Summer Olympics, Toba competed in a floor event in which he sustained an anterior cruciate ligament injury. Later, though visibly injured, he completed a pommel horse routine and helped Germany qualify for the finals.

Andreas Toba celebrated his comeback as a member of German national team after long and hard rehabilitation period at the World Gymnastics Championships in October 2017. He has performed on 2 apparatus (pommel horse with 12,933 points and still rings with 12,900 points).

Honours
 Bambi Award: 2016
 Sport personality of the year — Sparkasse Award for the cult-figure of sport: 2016
 An athlete with a heart: 2016 
 Solidarity Award of Manfred von Richthofen: 2016

References

External links 

  
 
 
 
 

German male artistic gymnasts
1990 births
Sportspeople from Hanover
Living people
Olympic gymnasts of Germany
Gymnasts at the 2012 Summer Olympics
Gymnasts at the 2016 Summer Olympics
German people of Romanian descent
European Games competitors for Germany
Gymnasts at the 2015 European Games
Gymnasts at the 2020 Summer Olympics